Norman Sisisky (June 9, 1927 – March 29, 2001) was a Democratic member of the United States House of Representatives from Virginia from 1983 until his death in 2001, representing the 4th District. He was a leader of the Blue Dog Coalition and one of the most conservative Democrats in Congress at the time.

Biography
Sisisky was a Jew born in Baltimore, Maryland but grew up in Richmond, Virginia. Upon graduating from high school, he served a two-year tour of duty in the U.S. Navy. In 1946, he entered Virginia Commonwealth University, earning a business degree in 1949. Sisisky became a successful businessman, founding an independent bottling company in Petersburg that later became a part of Pepsi's Virginia operations. In 1973, Sisisky was elected to the Virginia House of Delegates, serving for five terms.

In 1982, Sisisky was elected to Congress, defeating five-term incumbent Republican Robert Daniel. A fiscal disciplinarian, he aligned himself with the Democratic Party's Blue Dog coalition. He was a leading member of the Intelligence Committee and worked closely with the CIA.

Sisisky died of lung cancer while in office. A special election was held June 19, 2001 to fill his seat, and Republican State Senator Randy Forbes defeated Democratic State Senator Louise Lucas for the remainder of Sisisky's term.

Electoral history

1982; Sisisky was elected to the U.S. House of Representatives with 54.38% of the vote, defeating Republican Robert Daniel.
1984; Sisisky was re-elected unopposed.
1986; Sisisky was re-elected unopposed.
1988; Sisisky was re-elected unopposed.
1990; Sisisky was re-elected with 78.55% of the vote, defeating Independents Don L. Reynolds and Loretta F. Chandler.
1992; Sisisky was re-elected with 68.37% of the vote, defeating Republican Anthony J. Zevgolis.
1994; Sisisky was re-elected with 61.61% of the vote, defeating Republican A. George Sweet, III.
1996; Sisisky was re-elected with 78.61% of the vote, defeating Republican Zevgolis.
1998; Sisisky was re-elected unopposed.
2000; Sisisky was re-elected unopposed.

See also
 List of Jewish members of the United States Congress
 List of United States Congress members who died in office

References

External links

http://www.mackler.net/tree/sisisky/
https://www.jewishvirtuallibrary.org/jsource/biography/sisisky.html

1927 births
2001 deaths
20th-century American Jews
20th-century American politicians
21st-century American Jews
21st-century American politicians
Deaths from lung cancer in Virginia
Democratic Party members of the United States House of Representatives from Virginia
Jewish American military personnel
Jewish members of the United States House of Representatives
Democratic Party members of the Virginia House of Delegates
Politicians from Baltimore
Politicians from Richmond, Virginia
United States Navy sailors
Virginia Commonwealth University alumni